The 2017 French presidential election was held on 23 April and 7 May 2017. As no candidate won a majority in the first round, a runoff was held between the top two candidates, Emmanuel Macron of En Marche! (EM) and Marine Le Pen of the National Front (FN), which Macron won with a difference of more than 30% of the vote. The presidential election was followed by a legislative election to elect members of the National Assembly on 11 and 18 June. Incumbent president François Hollande of the Socialist Party (PS) was eligible to run for a second term, but declared on 1 December 2016 that he would not seek reelection in light of low approval ratings, making him the first incumbent head of state of the Fifth Republic not to seek reelection.

François Fillon of The Republicans (LR)—after winning the party's first open primary—and Le Pen of the National Front led first-round opinion polls in November 2016 and mid-January 2017. Polls tightened considerably by late January; after the publication of revelations that Fillon employed family members in possibly fictitious jobs in a series of politico-financial affairs that came to be colloquially known as "Penelopegate", Macron overtook Fillon to place consistently second in first-round polling. At the same time, Benoît Hamon won the Socialist primary, entering fourth place in the polls. After strong debate performances, Jean-Luc Mélenchon of La France Insoumise (FI) rose significantly in polls in late March, overtaking Hamon to place just below Fillon.

The first round was held under a state of emergency that was declared following the November 2015 Paris attacks. Following the result of the first round, Macron and Le Pen continued to the 7 May runoff. It was the first time since 2002 that a National Front candidate continued to the second round and the first time in the history of the Fifth Republic that the runoff did not include a nominee of the traditional left or right parties; their combined share of the vote from eligible voters, at approximately 26%, was also a historic low.

Estimations of the result of the second round on 7 May indicated that Macron had been elected by a decisive margin; Le Pen immediately conceded defeat. After the Interior Ministry published preliminary results, the official result of the second round was proclaimed by the Constitutional Council on 10 May. Overall, 43.6% of the registered electorate voted for Macron; in 2002, by contrast, two-thirds of eligible voters voted against then-FN candidate Jean-Marie Le Pen. When Macron took office on 14 May, he became the youngest holder of the presidency in French history and the youngest French head of state since Napoleon. He named Édouard Philippe as Prime Minister the next day. The initial government was assembled on 17 May; a legislative election on 11 and 18 June gave En Marche! a substantial majority.

Background 
The President of the French Republic and French Co-Prince of Andorra is elected to a five-year term in a two-round election under Article 7 of the Constitution: if no candidate secures an absolute majority of votes in the first round, a second round is held two weeks later between the two candidates who received the most votes. In 2017, the first and second rounds were held 23 April and 7 May.

Each presidential candidate must meet a specific set of requirements in order to run. They must be a French citizen of at least 18 years old. It is also necessary for candidates to be on an electoral roll, proving their eligibility to vote. 

To be listed on the first-round ballot, candidates must secure 500 signatures (often referred to as parrainages) from national or local elected officials from at least 30 different departments or overseas collectivities, with no more than a tenth of these signatories from any single department. The official signature collection period followed the publication of the Journal officiel on 25 February to 17 March. The collection period had initially been scheduled to begin on 23 February, but a visit by Prime Minister Bernard Cazeneuve to China on that date forced a delay. French prefectures mailed sponsorship forms to the 42,000 elected officials eligible to give their signature to a candidate, which must then be delivered to the Constitutional Council for validation. Unlike in previous years, a list of validated signatures was posted on Tuesday and Thursday of every week on the council's website; in the past, signatories were published only after the official candidate list had been verified after the end of the collection period. The end of the signature collection period also marked the deadline for the declaration of personal assets required of prospective candidates. The final list of candidates was declared on 21 March.The Conseil supérieur de l'audiovisuel (CSA) ensured that all candidates receive equal time in broadcast media "under comparable programming conditions" from 19 March onward. The CSA warned on 8 March that the amount of speaking time broadcasters had given Fillon and his supporters was "unusually high", even given the unusual circumstances surrounding his candidacy. After the official start of the campaign on 10 April, the CSA strictly enforced equal time in broadcast media. Campaigning for the first round of the election ended at midnight on 21 April, two days before the vote. The Constitutional Council verified the results of the first round between the 24–26 April and officially certified the vote tallies on 26 April, with the same procedure being used for the second round. The new President of the French Republic was set to be proclaimed on 11 May and undergo their investiture ceremony on 14 May at the latest.

Candidates 
On 18 March 2017, the Constitutional Council published the names of the 11 candidates who received 500 valid sponsorships, with the order of the list determined by drawing lots.

Sponsorships 
A candidate must secure 500 signatures from elected officials in order to appear on the first-round ballot, with the signature collection period ending on 17 March. The table below lists sponsorships received by the Constitutional Council by candidate.

Colour legend

Non-candidates

Socialist Party (PS) 
The 2017 presidential election was the first in the history of the Fifth Republic in which a sitting president did not seek a second term. On 1 December 2016, incumbent president François Hollande, acknowledging his low approval ratings, announced he would not seek a second term. His then-Prime Minister Manuel Valls declared on 5 December 2016 that he would run in the Socialist primary on 22 January 2017, but he was defeated by Benoît Hamon in its second round on 29 January.

Democratic Movement (MoDem) 

François Bayrou, the three-time centrist presidential candidate and leader of the Democratic Movement (MoDem) – who came fourth in 2002, third in 2007, and fifth in 2012 – initially supported the candidacy of Alain Juppé in the primary of the right against his long-time adversary Nicolas Sarkozy, whom he vowed to run against if he won the primary. However, Fillon's victory in the primary – which saw the elimination of Sarkozy in the first round and the defeat of Juppé in the runoff – led Bayrou to reconsider lodging a bid for the presidency, despite his 2014 election promise during his successful mayoral campaign in Pau that he would not seek the presidency if he won. After an extended period of suspense, he finally announced on 22 February that he would not run for a fourth time, instead proposing a conditional alliance with Emmanuel Macron, who accepted his offer.

Europe Ecology – The Greens (EELV)
On 9 July 2016, Europe Ecology – The Greens (EELV) announced that it would hold a primary election before the 2017 presidential election. Those wishing to be nominated required the support of 36 of its "federal councilors" out of 240; nominations were open to individuals in civic society as well. The vote was open to both party members as well as sympathizers who could register to vote in the primary. The announcement came just days after prominent environmentalist Nicolas Hulot's surprise declaration that he would not offer himself as a presidential candidate on 5 July. EELV were the first party to hold a presidential primary for the 2017 election, with two rounds held on 19 October and 7 November 2016. It was contested by deputy, former Minister of Territorial Equality and Housing, and ex-party leader Cécile Duflot, as well as three MEPs – Karima Delli, Yannick Jadot, and Michèle Rivasi.

Duflot was considered the early favorite, though she initially opposed holding a primary, aware of the risk that she might lose it; and highlighted her experience in government. Her main proposal was to incorporate the fight against climate change into the Constitution. Jadot was perceived as her main challenger; elected as an MEP in 2009, he worked with Greenpeace France from 2002 to 2008, specializing in transatlantic trade and climate issues. With Thomas Piketty and Daniel Cohn-Bendit, he sought a "primary of all the left", which failed to materialize. He rejected the "candidacy awaited by the political-media world" – that of Duflot, among others – and represented an anti-Duflot force from the party's right wing. Rivasi only barely managed to qualify for the primary, earlier lacking the necessary sponsorships. Like Jadot, she represented the radical wing of the party – albeit on its left flank – and served as deputy for Drôme from 1997 to 2002 and led Greenpeace France from 2003 to 2004. Delli, the daughter of Algerian immigrants, first became involved in politics as part of collective movements, and sought to become an MEP in 2009 after a stint as parliamentary assistant to Marie-Christine Blandin. Also of the party's left-wing, she declared that she would defend a "popular ecology".

Jadot and Rivasi advanced to the runoff after scoring 35.61% and 30.16%, respectively, in the first round; the other two candidates were eliminated, with Duflot garnering 24.41% and Delli 9.82%. Jadot won the second round of the primary on 7 November, obtaining 54.25% of the vote against Rivasi's 40.75%, becoming the nominee of the EELV in the presidential election. Jadot, who claimed 496 sponsorships just before the opening of the collection period, withdrew his candidacy on 23 February and endorsed Hamon, the pair having agreed on a common platform. An online vote among EELV primary voters from 24 and 26 February was required to confirm the agreement; an earlier vote to open talks with Hamon and Mélenchon was approved by 89.7% of those electors. The Hamon–Jadot alliance was consummated on 26 February; among those who cast a vote, 79.53% voted to support it, with 15.39% opposed and 5.08% submitting blank ballots, and an overall voter turnout of 55.25% (9,433 votes). This marks the first election since 1969 without a green candidate.

Primaries

The Republicans (LR) 

After his loss as the nominee of the Union for a Popular Movement (UMP) in the 2012 presidential election, ex-president Nicolas Sarkozy pledged to return to being a "Frenchman among the French". However, he announced on 19 September 2014 that he would seek the presidency of the party, a position he secured in an online vote on 29 November online vote with the backing of 64.50% of party members, against his main opponent Bruno Le Maire's 29.18%. He succeeded the triumvirate of Alain Juppé, François Fillon, and Jean-Pierre Raffarin, which assumed the party's leadership after the resignation of Jean-François Copé. Sarkozy was initially reluctant to accept the idea of holding a right-wing primary for the 2017 presidential election, but on 25 September 2014 he declared his support for a primary of the right after a warning from Juppé, who on 20 August made public his intention to run for the nomination.

The rules of the primary were confirmed in April 2015, scheduling the first round of an open primary for 20 November 2016, with a runoff on 27 November if no candidate received more than 50% of the vote. Those wishing to vote were required to pay €2 per ballot and sign a charter indicating their adherence to "Republican values of the right and centre". In order to appear on the ballot, prospective candidates needed to present sponsorships from 250 elected officials from at least 30 departments, with no more than a tenth from the same department, including at least 20 parliamentarians, in addition to the signatures of at least 2,500 party members across at least 15 departments, with no more than a tenth from the same department. The charter permitted other parties wishing to participate to set their own sponsorship requirements. The High Authority ultimately determined that seven candidates qualified to compete in the open primary of the right and centre: Fillon, Juppé, Le Maire, Copé, Sarkozy, and Nathalie Kosciusko-Morizet of the Republicans, the party's name after May 2015, as well as Jean-Frédéric Poisson of the Christian Democratic Party (PCD), who was not required to present signatures as the leader of another party. The National Centre of Independents and Peasants (CNIP) were also allowed to participate, but not to present a candidate.

The primary was initially fought primarily between Juppé and Sarkozy, the top two candidates in primary polls. Sarkozy's program emphasized the themes of Islam, immigration, security, and defense. He proposed to end family reunifications and reform the right to birthright citizenship, halt the flow of economic migrants, and increase residence requirements to secure French nationality. He reaffirmed his interest in the "assimilation" of immigrants, and intended to ban other menus for school canteens (i.e., options for Muslim students) as well as Muslim headscarves at universities. Sarkozy also suggested that radical imams be expelled and suspected terrorists be detained by authorities and tried by a special anti-terrorist court, in addition a reduction in the age of criminal responsibility from 18 to 16. He proposed to postpone the increase the retirement age to 64 until 2024, permit exemptions to the 35-hour workweek, cut 300,000 civil service jobs by increasing working hours to 37 per week, and abolish the wealth tax (ISF). Like Le Maire, he did not rule out the possibility of a referendum on the European Union (EU). He also sought a European treaty "refounding", the creation of a European monetary fund, to commit 2% to defense spending by 2025, and to reduce public spending by €100 billion and taxes by €40 billion while reducing the budget deficit to under 3% of GDP.

In contrast to Sarkozy, Juppé spoke of a "happy identity" and emphasized the importance of integration as opposed to assimilation. He supported drawing up a common list of "safe countries" to differentiate refugees from economic migrants, setting a "quota" on immigrants as necessary, and to stop providing foreign aid to countries refusing to comply with their obligation to accept deported citizens. He questioned Sarkozy's proposals on Schengen and instead merely acknowledged that it was not functioning correctly, but concurred with him in exempting the acquisition of French nationality by foreigners at the age of 18 if previously convicted. Juppé also demanded transparency on the funding of places of worship, civic training for imams, and, unlike Sarkozy, favored allowing women to wear the Muslim headscarf at universities. On economic issues, he proposed to end the 35-hour workweek, abolish the wealth tax, reduce corporate taxation, and set the retirement age at 65. He also pledged to slash in half the number of parliamentarians, renegotiate Schengen, and increase defense spending in absolute terms by at least €7 billion by 2022.

After several strong debate performances by Fillon, however, a second-round Juppé–Sarkozy duel no longer appeared inevitable. Fillon's rise was propelled by his proposals for a rigorous economic program. Seeking €100 billion in cuts, he proposed eliminating 500,000 civil service jobs by 2022 and a return to the 39-hour workweek for civil servants. Like the other primary candidates, he planned to eliminate the wealth tax; in addition, Fillon suggested abolishing the 35-hour workweek – capping it at the 48-hour maximum allowed within the EU – and the implementation of other liberal economic measures. He also adopted a staunchly conservative social program, opposing adoption by same-sex couples and arguing France had no religious problem apart from Islam itself. Like Sarkozy, he sought to expand the capacity of French prisons, but unlike his former superior, he opposed banning religious symbols in public places. He also professed a more pro-Russian stance than other candidates, urging cooperation in Syria against the Islamic State and supporting the "pragmatism" of Vladimir Putin's intervention in the Syrian civil war.

The first round of the primary on 20 November saw the unexpected elimination of Sarkozy, with Fillon coming in first with 44.1%, Juppé at 28.6%, and Sarkozy at 20.7% of the vote, and all other candidates far behind. A second round between Fillon and Juppé was confirmed, and Sarkozy announced that he would vote for his former Prime Minister soon after the results became clear. Fillon scored a landslide victory in the 27 November runoff with 66.5% of the vote to Juppé's 33.5% and became the Republicans' nominee; voter turnout – at 4.4 million – was even higher than in the first round.

Socialist Party (PS) 

At the 2012 Toulouse Congress, the Socialist Party (PS) modified its statutes to guarantee the selection of a candidate of the left through open primaries, with the National Council of the Socialist Party announcing the timetable and organization of the primaries at least one year beforehand. On 11 January, Libération published an editorial in favor of a "primary of the left and ecologists", and on 9 April the National Council of the Socialist Party unanimously approved the idea of holding such a primary in early December. On 18 June, the National Council finally confirmed that it would organize a primary to select a candidate for the 2017 presidential election. Applications could be submitted from 1 to 15 December, with two rounds of voting planned for 22 and 29 January 2017. Prospective PS candidates were required to sign the primary's charter of ethics requiring candidates to rally behind its winner and to secure the support of 5% of one of the following groups: members of the National Council; Socialist parliamentarians, regional and departmental Socialist councilors in at least 4 regions and 10 departments; or Socialist mayors representing more than 10,000 people in at least 4 regions and 10 departments. The conditions for becoming a candidate of other member parties of the BAP – the PRG, UDE, PE, and Democratic Front (FD) – were determined by the respective parties' leadership.

The EELV declared on 20 June that it would not participate in the primary, and the French Communist Party (PCF) did likewise the following day. After declaring his candidacy for the presidential election, Emmanuel Macron of En Marche! also declined to participate, as did Jean-Luc Mélenchon under the banner of la France Insoumise, saying that he did not want to run in a primary with François Hollande since he would not be able to support Hollande if he won. He later reaffirmed this by saying that with the exclusion of the EELV and PRG the primary was not truly "of the left" but a "primary of the Socialist Party". On 1 December, Hollande declared that he would not seek a second term, becoming the first President of the Fifth Republic to renounce a reelection bid. His announcement reflected his high personal unpopularity and resentment among Socialist colleagues regarding remarks he made about cabinet members and other associates in the book Un président ne devrait pas dire ça... (A president should not say that...) by Gérard Davet and Fabrice Lhomme, journalists at Le Monde.

On 17 December, the High Authority declared that seven candidates qualified to appear on the ballot: four from the Socialist Party – former Prime Minister Manuel Valls, Arnaud Montebourg, Benoît Hamon, and Vincent Peillon – and François de Rugy of the PE, Sylvia Pinel of the PRG, and Jean-Luc Bennahmias of the PD. Early opinion polling placed Valls and Montebourg first and second, respectively, with Hamon a close third. Shortly after declaring his candidacy on 5 December, Valls proposed to abolish article 49.3 of the French constitution, a procedure that allows bypassing legislative approval, in a "democratic renaissance"; as Prime Minister, he invoked it on six occasions, using it to pass the Macron and El Khomri laws. He also proposed a 2.5% increase in public spending while keeping the budget deficit under 3%, guaranteeing a "decent income" of €800, reducing the gender pay gap by half, pausing the enlargement of the European Union, appending a charter of secularism to the Constitution, consolidating the nuclear industry, and mandating six months of civic service. He was twice physically attacked during the primary campaign: on 22 December, he was flour-bombed by a protester in Strasbourg saying "we do not forget [the 49.3]!", and on 17 January, he was slapped by a young Breton regionalist in Lamballe, who was subsequently charged.

Former Minister of the Economy Arnaud Montebourg, a Socialist rebel known for promoting "made in France", presented a firmly left-wing project shortly after declaring his candidacy in August 2016. He promised to offer French enterprises preference in bidding, reverse the 2011 tax increases on the French middle class, and repeal most of the El Khomri labor law while preserving certain "interesting" social protections such as the "right to disconnect" and "personal activity account". Critical of European austerity, he declared that he would defy the requirement to maintain a budget deficit under 3% of GDP and intended to strengthen intelligence services, require six months of civic service, and achieve gender equality. He also proposed €30 billion in spending to stimulate economic growth, lower the general social contribution (CSG) to increase individuals' purchasing power by €800 a year, create 5,000 new posts in hospitals, call a referendum on a new republic, promulgate a law on the separation of banking activities (as Hollande did), impose a European carbon tax, and establish a national anti-terrorism prosecutor.

The signature proposal of Benoît Hamon was the implementation a universal basic income for all French citizens, rolled out in stages beginning in 2018, partially funded by a tax levied on property combining the existing property tax (taxe foncière) and the solidarity tax on wealth (ISF), in addition to a tax on robots to fund social protections in general. Like fellow Socialist dissidents, Hamon criticized the El Khomri labor law and promised to repeal it if elected, and suggested that it be replaced with legislation acknowledging the need for greater social protections, including the right to disconnect and recognizing burnout as an occupational disease. He also proposed to reduce the 35-hour workweek to 32 hours, saying that it was time to put an end to the "myth" of economic growth. Another of his flagship proposals was to legalize cannabis, using funds for "prevention" rather than "repression".

In the first round of the primary on 22 January, Hamon and Valls received 36.03% and 31.48%, respectively, and advanced to the runoff on 29 January. Montebourg, who secured only 17.52% of votes, declared that he would cast his second-round vote for Hamon soon after the result became apparent. Among the remaining candidates, Peillon secured 6.81% of the vote, de Rugy 3.83%, Pinel 2.00%, and Bennahmias 1.02%. Overall turnout stood at 1.66 million. The legitimacy of the first-round results published by the organizers of the primary was questioned by observers in the French press, who noted that an overnight update added 352,013 votes without significantly changing each candidate's percentage, with vote totals for each candidate increasing by 28%. , president of the organizing committee of the primary, claimed that the anomaly was nothing more than a "bug" induced by pressure to update the level of participation in the first round, effectively acknowledging that the results of the primary were manipulated. Only on 23 January did the High Authority of the primary publish "validated" results. In the second round of the primary on 29 January, Hamon defeated Valls by a comfortable margin, 58.69% to 41.31%; turnout, at 2.05 million, was considerably higher than in the first round. As the winner of the primary, Hamon became the Socialist nominee for president.

On 22 February, François de Rugy announced his support for Emmanuel Macron, breaking the commitment requested of former candidates to back the winner of the primary. While acknowledging that Hamon was the legitimate PS nominee, de Rugy said he preferred "coherence to obedience". On 13 March, Le Parisien reported that Valls, rather than backing Hamon, would urge voters to support Macron in the first round of the presidential election; Valls denied the report at the time, but on 29 March declared that he would vote for Macron but would not rally behind his candidacy. On 8 April the High Authority of the PS reminded party members to abide by the "principle of loyalty". On 15 March, the PRG announced its support for Hamon, securing concessions on issues pertaining to European governance, and confirmed an agreement with the Socialist Party for the legislative elections; this followed a period of hesitation after the primary in which the party contemplated Macron's candidacy, which secured several of its parliamentarians' support.

Fillon affair (Penelopegate) 

On 25 January 2017, the satirical weekly Le Canard enchaîné first alleged that François Fillon employed his wife Penelope as his parliamentary assistant from 1998 and 2002 and for six months in 2012, with no evidence that she completed any substantial work. She collected a monthly salary of €3,900 to €4,600. After her husband's appointment as Minister of Social Affairs in 2002 and during his later tenure as Minister of National Education, she went on to serve until 2007 as a parliamentary aide to Marc Joulaud, Fillon's substitute, earning an increased salary upwards of €7,900 and with still no evidence of substantial work. The article claimed that she received a total of over €500,000 as a parliamentary aide, as well as €100,000 as a literary adviser to the Revue des deux Mondes. Its owner, billionaire Marc Ladreit de Lacharrière, is a close friend of François Fillon. While deputies in the National Assembly can employ family members, those are still required to complete legitimate work, evidence of which the paper was unable to find. Based on that information and on the same day, the PNF (Parquet national financier, or national financial prosecutor's office) initiated a preliminary investigation into possible embezzlement and misuse of public funds.

On 26 January, François Fillon appeared on TF1 to respond to these allegations, stating that his wife had "edited my speeches" and "stood in for me at events when I couldn’t be there", also claiming that the reason that she was never seen working in the Palais Bourbon was because "she was never on the front line". In the interview, he disclosed that he also paid two of his children while a Senator for the Sarthe between 2005 and 2007, claiming that he employed them in their capacity as lawyers. He also pledged to resign if he would be personally placed under investigation. However, on 27 January, it was revealed that both Marie and Charles Fillon were only law students when their father employed them during his stint in the Senate, contrary to his statements the previous day. Interrogated by investigators the same day, former editor-in-chief of the Revue des deux Mondes Michel Crépu claimed that only "two or maybe three" bylines in the review were attributed to her, also saying that he had seen "no trace" of any work by her that would "resemble [that of] a literary adviser".

On 1 February, a week after its initial report, Le Canard enchaîné published revelations that the total sum received by Penelope Fillon in fictitious jobs apparently totaled more than €930,000; with the addition of the period from 1988 to 1990, her income as a parliamentary assistant now totaled €831,440. In addition, the satirical weekly also revealed that the payments to two of Fillon's children reached nearly €84,000, with €57,084 net for Marie Fillon and €26,651 for Charles Fillon. Video excerpts of a May 2007 Sunday Telegraph interview with Penelope Fillon surfaced on 2 February, in which she claimed that she had "never been his assistant", referring to her husband; The footage aired on Envoyé spécial on France 2 that evening. The PNF expanded investigation into the fictitious employment affair to include Fillon's two eldest children the same day to verify the veracity of their work, after Le Canard enchaîné reported that neither Marie nor Charles Fillon were lawyers at the time their father served in the Senate. In a video on 3 February, François Fillon insisted that he would maintain his candidacy and called on his supporters to "hold the line", seeking to assuage worries from within his own camp about the maintenance of his candidacy.

On 6 February, Fillon held a press conference at which he "apologized to the French people" and acknowledged that he had committed an "error" in employing family members as parliamentary assistants, but appended that he "never broke the law". He also argued that his wife's "salary was perfectly justified", adding that everything reported by the press on the issue was "legal and transparent". He said he would not reimburse the payments received by his wife or children, and, saying that he had "nothing to hide", divulged his property holdings. In addition to promising that his lawyers would question the competency of the PNF to carry out the investigation, he lambasted a "media lynching" of his campaign. His remarks followed Juppé's declaration that "NO means NO" earlier in the day in response to rumors that he might replace Fillon as the party's candidate should he decide to drop his bid.

Le Canard enchaîné continued its run of stories on Fillon in its issue of 8 February, revealing that Penelope Fillon collected severance payments totaling €45,000, with €16,000 in August 2002 for the period 1998–2002 and €29,000 in 2013 for seventeen months of employment for which she earned €65,839. The satirical weekly also asserted that she received a double salary during the summer of 2002, as she was hired by Joulaud's office on 13 July, more than a month before her contract as a parliamentary assistant with her husband expired, on 21 August. Although aides are eligible to collect severance payments, the law does not permit such a high level for parliamentary assistants. Fillon responded to the claims in a press release by saying that Le Canard enchaîné conflated the amount his wife collected in November 2013 with reported earnings in August 2007 after the conclusion of her work with Joulaud, and denounced the paper's allegations as "lies".

On 16 February, Fillon seemingly withdrew his earlier promise that he would terminate his candidacy if placed under formal investigation, saying "even if I am put under investigation, nothing will stop me" in private. In an interview with Le Figaro published on 17 February, he insisted on continuing his campaign, declaring "I am the candidate and I will continue until victory" and that the closer to the election it was, the "more scandalous it would be to deprive the right and centre of a candidate". On 24 February the PNF finally opened a judicial investigation into the "embezzlement of public funds, [...] influence-peddling and failure to comply with transparency obligations of the HATVP" against François Fillon, his wife, two of his children, and Marc Joulaud (who were left unnamed, presumably, to allow for expanding the investigation to other suspects, if necessary). The OCLCIFF, which failed to unearth any tangible proof of work by Fillon's wife as a parliamentary assistant to her husband from 1988 to 1990, 1998 to 2000, and 2012 to 2013 or to Marc Joulaud from 2002 to 2007, and was unconvinced by the two reviews in the Revue des deux Mondes attributed to Penelope Fillon, tasked three investigative judges to continue pursuing the affair. These three judges were identified on 27 February as Serge Tournaire, Stéphanie Tacheau, and Aude Buresi.

On 1 March, Fillon was informed that he was summoned to appear before the judges and likely to be placed under formal investigation – generally a precursor to an eventual indictment – on 15 March. In the subsequent hours and days, hundreds of campaign members, allies, and supporters rescinded their support for Fillon, including the Union of Democrats and Independents (UDI), a centre-right party whose president Jean-Christophe Lagarde backed Juppé in the primary, suspended its participation in the campaign. fifteen campaign staffers, and hundreds of others; a total of 306 elected officials and members of the Fillon campaign withdrew their support for the candidate by 5 March. Many of those rescinding their support speculated about the potential return of Juppé to replace Fillon as the party's candidate, with Fenech urging elected officials file sponsorships for the ex-primary candidate. Meanwhile, associates of Juppé indicated that he was apparently warming to the idea of stepping in to run if needed, "ready but loyal".

Despite this chain of defections, François Fillon remained defiant, holding a rally at the Trocadéro on that afternoon intended as show of force. He then appeared on 20 heures on France 2 that evening, during which he refused to give up his candidacy, saying that "there is no alternative" and adding that "no one today can stop me from being a candidate", insisting that "it is not the party that will decide" the fate of his candidacy. He said that the rally at the Trocadéro cemented his legitimacy, and that though he would have stepped down two months ago if indicted then, it was now too close to the presidential election and it would be unfair to voters of the right if he quit now. With a "political committee" planned for the following day, he proposed to assemble a modified campaign team, naming François Baroin, Éric Ciotti, and Luc Chatel, in an attempt to rally support around his candidacy. Immediately after Fillon's appearance, Juppé announced on Twitter that he give a statement to the press in Bordeaux at 10:30 CET the day after.

Juppé officially announced his abstention from the race on 6 March, saying that "for me, it is too late", and added that Fillon was at a "dead end" with his allegations of political assassination. The same day, the party's "political committee" rallied behind Fillon, unanimously reaffirming its support for his candidacy. The same day, Le Canard enchaîné revealed that Fillon had failed to declare to the HATVP a €50,000 loan from Marc Ladreit de Lacharrière, president of the Revue des deux Mondes. The UDI renewed its support for Fillon that evening, albeit only conditionally. On 13 March, Le Parisien revealed that investigators discovered suspicious wire transfers made by Marie and Charles Fillon to their father while employed by him, with Marie returning €33,000 of the €46,000 she was paid. Charles Fillon, in his hearing, referred to similar transfers to his parents' joint account, worth about 30% of his salary.

On the morning of 14 March, Fillon was placed under formal investigation for misuse of public funds, embezzlement, and failure to comply with HATVP disclosure requirements. On 16 March the investigation into Fillon was extended to "aggravated fraud, forgery, and falsification of records". In particular, the probe sought to determine whether documents seized during a search of the National Assembly in March were forged in order to corroborate the veracity of Penelope Fillon's work as a parliamentary assistant. The investigation was also expanded into possible influence-peddling related to Fillon's consulting firm 2F Conseil, which was previously hired by billionaire Marc Ladreit de Lacharrière, owner of the Revue des deux Mondes, which employed Penelope Fillon. In 2013 de Lacharrière also provided a €50,000 loan to François Fillon, who failed to declare it as legally required. On L'Émission politique on 23 March, Fillon said that Bienvenue Place Beauvau, a book co-authored by Didier Hassoux of Le Canard enchaîné, suggested President Hollande ran a shadow cabinet to spread rumours about his opponents, a claim Hassoux subsequently denied. On 24 March, Marc Joulaud, Fillon's former substitute, was formally placed under investigation for embezzlement of public funds. Penelope Fillon was placed under formal investigation for complicity in and concealment of embezzlement and misuse of public funds, as well as aggravated fraud, on 28 March.

On 10 April, Mediapart revealed that Penelope Fillon had in fact been paid by the National Assembly starting in 1982, not 1986, as earlier claimed by François Fillon. The edition of Le Canard enchaîné set for publication on 12 April revealed that François Fillon secured his then-fiancée a job three times the minimum wage in a Parisian ministry as early as 1980 while he was serving as deputy chief of staff to Minister of Defence Joël Le Theule; her contract ended in 1981, after 15 months, after the Socialists swept into power.

Other incidents 

After securing his party's nomination in its presidential primary on 29 January 2017, Socialist Party (PS) dissident Benoît Hamon proposed forming a "governmental majority" with Jean-Luc Mélenchon of la France Insoumise (FI) and Yannick Jadot of Europe Ecology – The Greens (EELV), seeking to "reconcile the left and the environmentalists". Though Mélenchon had earlier demonstrated hostility to the possibility of an alliance, he expressed "satisfaction" with Hamon's sentiments shortly after the primary. On 23 February, Jadot cemented an agreement to withdraw his candidacy in favor of Hamon, but on 26 February Hamon acknowledged that talks to secure an alliance with Mélenchon had failed, the pair only agreeing to a code of mutual respect. The talks failed in part because of the candidates' differing positions on matters related to the European Union (EU), European Central Bank (ECB), EU treaties, European defense, and the obligation to maintain a budget deficit below 3% of GDP, among other divergences.

During a trip to Algeria on 15 February, Emmanuel Macron, candidate of En Marche!, remarked in an interview with local press that the French presence in the country had been a "crime against humanity" and "truly barbaric", drawing the ire of numerous right-wing French politicians. François Fillon of the Republicans denounced Macron's remarks as a "hatred of our history, this constant repentance is unworthy of a candidate for the presidency of the Republic". Seeking to put aside the controversy in a meeting in Toulon on 18 February, he attempted to qualify his remarks, saying that he was "sorry" for having "hurt" and "offended" many as a result, but nevertheless continued to insist on acknowledging that France had a responsibility for its colonial past, not just in Algeria. His remarks were followed by a temporary resurgence for Fillon in polls of voting intentions.

The various investigations of the fictitious employment of 29 parliamentary assistants to 23 National Front (FN) MEPs, implicating the entourage of Marine Le Pen, continued through 2017. These fictitious jobs would constitute €7.5 million in losses for European taxpayers from the period 2010 to 2016. The European Anti-fraud Office pursued the case, establishing that one of Le Pen's parliamentary assistants, Catherine Griset, never secured a lease in Brussels during the five years she was employed and only rarely appeared in the European Parliament, while another, Thierry Légier, worked as a bodyguard at the same time. Though the European Parliament demanded that Le Pen return €298,392 by 31 January 2018, representing the salary "unduly paid" to Griset, she refused to do so, and the European Parliament began to reduce her salary to reclaim the money. On 20 February, investigators raided the FN's headquarters in Nanterre for a second time in connection to the case; though Le Pen was summoned to appear before judges on 22 February in the Griset case, she refused to do so until after the June legislative elections, invoking the parliamentary immunity granted to her as an MEP. On 3 March, summoned to appear before judges to potentially be charged for breach of confidence, Le Pen was absent, again affirming that she would not respond to the case before the end of the campaign. On 6 March, Charles Hourcade, who served as parliamentary assistant to FN MEP Marie-Christine Boutonnet, faced charges of "concealment of breach of confidence" in a separate case; like Le Pen, who described the investigations into the FN's fictitious employment of parliamentary assistants as a "political operation", Boutonnet declined to appear before judges.

On 20 April, three days before the first round, three police officers were shot and one killed in an attack on the Champs-Élysées, interrupting the 15 minutes pour convaincre (15 minutes to convince) on France 2, a program featuring successive interviews with the 11 candidates; in the following interviews, the remaining candidates paid tribute to the victims of the attack. In the wake of the attack, Le Pen and Fillon, suspended campaign activities the following day – the final day of campaigning – while Macron canceled two trips and Mélenchon insisted on maintaining his schedule to demonstrate that he would not allow violence to interrupt the democratic process; Hamon made similar remarks, proceeding with one campaign event the following day.

A report published on 25 April by the Japan-based security firm Trend Micro alleged that a group of hackers was targeting the Macron campaign. The group, known as "Pawn Storm" (better known as APT28 or "Fancy Bear"), is believed to be linked to the Russian state, and was responsible for previous attacks, including on TV5Monde in April and the Bundestag in May 2015. In particular, the group attempted a phishing operation, registering four domains strongly resembling those actually used by En Marche!, of which three were domiciled in Ukraine and one in France. 

In an interview with Associated Press the head of the French government's cyber security agency, which investigated leaks from President Emmanuel Macron's election campaign, said that they didn't find any trace of a notorious Russian hacking group behind the attack.

First round 

The official campaign began on 10 April and ended at midnight on 21 April. During this period, the Conseil supérieur de l'audiovisuel was to ensure equal speaking time for candidates in audiovisual media. On French public broadcasters, ten slots were allotted to the eleven candidates from 10 to 18 and 20 April, with nine slots on 19 April and eleven slots – one for each candidate – on 21 April, the final day of active campaigning.

Voting in the first round took place on Saturday 22 April from 08:00 to 19:00 (local time) in the French overseas departments and territories situated east of the International Date Line and west of metropolitan France (i.e. French Guiana, French Polynesia, Guadeloupe, Martinique, Saint Martin, Saint Barthélemy and Saint Pierre and Miquelon), as well as at French diplomatic missions in the Americas. Although overseas voting took place one day before that in metropolitan France, the election results and final turnout figures were announced at the same time, starting at 20:00 (Paris time) on 23 April, once voting ended in metropolitan France. Voting in metropolitan France (as well as the French overseas departments and territories of Mayotte, New Caledonia, Réunion and Wallis and Futuna, and French diplomatic missions outside the Americas) took place on 23 April from 08:00 to 19:00 or 20:00 (local time).

The official election results were declared by the Constitutional Council on 26 April, with Macron and Le Pen advancing to the second round.

Debates 

A debate between François Fillon, Benoît Hamon, Marine Le Pen, Emmanuel Macron, and Jean-Luc Mélenchon took place on 20 March, hosted by TF1 and moderated by journalists Anne-Claire Coudray and Gilles Bouleau. It was the first time that a debate prior to the first round was held. The choice of date meant that TF1 would not be required to provide candidates with equal speaking time, as Conseil supérieur de l'audiovisuel (CSA) regulations do not go into force until 9 April, the start of the official campaign. Nicolas Dupont-Aignan, who was not invited, denounced the debate as a "rape of democracy", and the CSA urged TF1 to guarantee fair speaking time for other candidates. Dupont-Aignan filed an appeal that was rejected in part because he had already received airtime proportionate to his support. On 18 March, appearing on TF1, he quit mid-interview, furious at his exclusion from the network's debate. The first debate began with an introductory question – "What kind of president do you want to be?" – followed by segments on three themes lasting about 50 minutes each: what type of society France should have, what type of economic model France should adopt, and the place of France in the world. The five candidates were given two minutes to answer each question, but opponents had the opportunity to interject 90 seconds in. The debate was three and a half hours long, and was watched by 9.8 million (47% of the audience share) on TF1, peaking at 11.5 million.

BFM TV and CNews hosted the second debate on 4 April at 20:40 CEST, moderated by Ruth Elkrief and Laurence Ferrari, inviting all candidates who qualified to appear on the first-round ballot. The start time, earlier than that of the TF1 debate, was chosen to avoid continuing well past midnight. Three themes were addressed: employment, the French social model, and the protection of the French. The final part of the debate concerned the exercise of power and moralization of public officials. Each of the 11 candidates invited had a minute and a half to answer each question, and other candidates were permitted to challenge their answers. This was the first ever debate including all first-round candidates; A total of 6.3 million people representing an audience share of 32% viewed the debate; BFM TV alone claimed 5.5 million viewers, equivalent to 28% audience share – an all-time record for the channel.

France 2 intended to host a debate with all candidates on 20 April, but on 28 March Mélenchon stated he was unhappy with its timing, planning not to attend, and would prefer that it be held before 17 April. Macron also expressed reservations about the proposed third debate, stating that he wanted only one debate with all 11 candidates before the first round, and preferably not just three days before the first round of voting. On 29 March, the CSA indicated that it was "concerned" that the date of the debate was too close to the first round, and recommended that candidates and broadcasters work to find an agreement as quickly as possible. France Télévisions decided to maintain the date of 20 April due to the lack of a consensus on an alternative the following day, but abandoned plans for a third debate on 5 April, instead proposing that individual candidates be interviewed by Léa Salamé and David Pujadas during that timeslot. The plan was finally confirmed on 18 April, with France 2 offering successive 15-minute interviews to the 11 candidates with the two hosts.

Electorate

Second round 

After being eliminated in the first round, both François Fillon and Benoît Hamon called to vote for Emmanuel Macron, while Jean-Luc Mélenchon refused to pronounce in favor of either candidate, preferring to first consult activists from his movement. Jean Lassalle and Nathalie Arthaud opted to cast a blank vote, Philippe Poutou and François Asselineau gave no voting instructions, and Jacques Cheminade only stated that he would personally refuse to vote for Le Pen and denounced the forces of "financial occupation". Nicolas Dupont-Aignan endorsed Le Pen during the evening of 28 April, and was subsequently revealed as her choice for Prime Minister the following day. On 2 May, the result of Mélenchon's consultation was published, with 36.12% voting for a blank vote, 34.83% supporting a vote for Macron, and 29.05% opting to abstain; Mélenchon, for his part, issued no voting instructions, only urging his supporters not to make the "terrible error" of voting for Le Pen. Jean-Marie Le Pen supported his daughter.

On the evening of the first round, Macron and members of his entourage celebrated the result at La Rotonde, a brasserie in the 6th arrondissement of Paris; the move was criticized as premature and complacent, viewed as reminiscent of Nicolas Sarkozy's widely criticized post-election celebration at Fouquet's in 2007. On 24 April, Le Pen vacated her position as leader of the National Front on 24 April to focus on her presidential candidacy but remained a member of the party. On 26 April, while Macron met with union representatives in his hometown of Amiens employed at the local Whirlpool factory, slated to close in 2018, Le Pen arrived at the site of the factory outdoors around noon in a visit to speak with workers, catching Macron by surprise. When Macron subsequently arrived at the factory site in mid-afternoon, he was whistled and heckled by a hostile crowd, with some shouting "Marine présidente", before he subsequently spoke with the workers for half an hour.

The official campaign ended at midnight on 5 May. Just minutes before the election silence went into effect, emails and documents from the Macron campaign were leaked on a file-sharing website. The campaign team subsequently issued a statement claiming that they had been compromised, and alleged that the leak contained both real as well and some fabricated documents. Numerama, an online publication focusing on digital life, described the leaked material as "utterly mundane", consisting of "the contents of a hard drive and several emails of co-workers and En Marche political officials." Leaked documents included "memos, bills, loans for amounts that are hardly over-the-top, recommendations and other reservations, amidst, of course, exchanges that are strictly personal and private — personal notes on the rain and sunshine, a confirmation email for the publishing of a book, reservation of a table for friends, etc.", in addition to some documents unrelated to Macron.

Voting in the second round took place on Saturday 6 May from 08:00 to 19:00 (local time) in the French overseas departments and territories situated east of the International Date Line and west of metropolitan France (i.e. French Guiana, French Polynesia, Guadeloupe, Martinique, Saint Martin, Saint Barthélemy and Saint Pierre and Miquelon), as well as at French diplomatic missions in the Americas. Voting in metropolitan France (as well as the French overseas departments and territories of Mayotte, New Caledonia, Réunion and Wallis and Futuna, and French diplomatic missions outside the Americas) took place on Sunday 7 May from 08:00 to 19:00 or 20:00 (local time). The results of the second round were officially proclaimed on 10 May.

Debate 
Though TF1 initially had plans to hold its own debate between the first and second round, it instead jointly hosted one with France 2. BFM TV also originally intended to host a debate between the two rounds, and it sought to join France 2 and TF1 in co-hosting a single debate but was rebuffed; while all channels were welcome to broadcast the debate, CEO of France Télévisions Delphine Ernotte said, it would not accept such an arrangement with BFM TV, which would mean three journalists moderating the debate. Unlike Jacques Chirac, who refused to debate Jean-Marie Le Pen after the latter's surprise advancement to the second round in the 2002 presidential election, Macron agreed to debate Marine Le Pen on 3 May. The debate, planned to start at 21:00 CEST and last 2 hours and 20 minutes, was originally to be moderated by Gilles Bouleau and David Pujadas; however, after the Conseil supérieur de l'audiovisuel (CSA) raised concerns that the moderators would both be men for the first time since 1995, the final pair of Christophe Jakubyszyn of TF1 and Nathalie Saint-Cricq of France 2 was chosen. A total of 16.5 million people (60% of the audience share) watched the debate.

The debate was considered to have significantly damaged the image of Le Pen and the FN before the second round of the election, with Le Pen criticized for being overly aggressive, arrogant, and amateur in the topics at hand, and was also attributed as a cause of the poor performance of the FN in the subsequent legislative elections.

Electorate

Opinion polls 

First round

Second round

Results

First round

By department

By region

Maps

Second round

Tables

Maps

Aftermath

On 8 May, Macron joined President Hollande on the Champs-Elysées to commemorate the 72nd anniversary of the surrender of Germany. The official transfer of power took place on 14 May, after which Macron nominated his prime minister and government. The legislative elections to elect the 15th National Assembly were held a month after the presidential election, with two rounds on 11 and 18 June 2017, in which En Marche! presented its candidates under the label of La République En Marche!; a list of the movement's candidates for the legislative elections was published on 11 May.

Following the second round of the presidential election on 7 May, Macron announced he would be stepping down as president of En Marche!, Le Pen announced that she would undertake a "profound transformation" of the National Front, and Mélenchon urged his supporters to mobilize in the legislative elections.

Campaign accounts 
The campaign accounts of the eleven candidates were submitted by 7 July 2017 and published in August 2017, and were validated and reimbursement announced by the National Commission for Campaign Accounts and Political Financing on 13 February 2018.

References

Further reading
Elgie, Robert. "The election of Emmanuel Macron and the new French party system: a return to the éternel marais?." Modern & Contemporary France 26.1 (2018): 15–29.
 Evans, Jocelyn, and Gilles Ivaldi. The 2017 French Presidential Elections: A Political Reformation? (Springer, 2017) excerpt.
 Evans, Jocelyn, and Gilles Ivaldi. "An atypical ‘honeymoon’election? Contextual and strategic opportunities in the 2017 French legislative elections." French Politics 15.3 (2017): 322–339. Online
 Ferrara, Emilio. "Disinformation and social bot operations in the run up to the 2017 French presidential election." arXiv (2017) online.
Gil, Cameron Michael. "Spatial analysis of La République En Marche and French Parties, 2002–2017." French Politics (2018): 1–27.
Gougou, Florent, and Simon Persico. "A new party system in the making? The 2017 French presidential election." French Politics 15.3 (2017): 303–321. online
 Gougou, Florent, and Nicolas Sauger. "The 2017 French Election Study (FES 2017): a post-electoral cross-sectional survey." French Politics 15.3 (2017): 360–370. Online
 Maillot, Agnès. "Setting the agenda? The Front National and the 2017 French presidential election." Irish Studies in International Affairs 28 (2017): 45–56. Online 
 Mény, Yves. "A tale of party primaries and outsider candidates: the 2017 French presidential election." French politics 15.3 (2017): 265–278.
 Schön-Quinlivan, Emmanuelle. "‘The elephant in the room’ no more: Europe as a structuring line of political cleavage in the 2017 presidential election." French Politics 15.3 (2017): 290-302 online.

External links

Constitutional Council 
Ministry of the Interior 
List of all sponsorships by elected officials 
Data and graphics for sponsorships 
Results of the first round of the presidential election by constituency 

 
President
President
Presidential elections in France
France